Frederick Charles "Charlie" "Wag" Keetley (10 March 1906 — 1979) was an English football centre forward born in Derby. He played for Leeds United, Bradford City and Reading.

Keetley was the youngest of eleven brothers and one sister. Several of his brothers played professionally including Arthur, Harry, Tom, Frank and Joe.

He began working at Rolls-Royce Foundry in Derby as a core maker. In 1926–27, he was playing for Alvaston and Boulton where he scored 80 goals.

Charlie was signed for Leeds United in June 1927 by Dick Ray, who had previous signed his 4 brothers for Doncaster Rovers. During the 1927–28 season Keetley scored 18 goals in just 16 games. He went on to be the club's top goal-scorer in three seasons—in 1928–29, 1930–31 and 1931–32. In his last full season at Elland Road he suffered from injury and lack of form, scoring 7 times in 16 appearances.

In October 1934 he moved to Bradford City where he played just 22 league games, scoring four goals, but also scored twice as City upset Aston Villa in a third round FA Cup tie on 12 January 1935.

At the end of the 1934–35 he moved to Reading and in 1936 to Stalybridge Celtic.

After finishing his football career he returned to work for Rolls-Royce before becoming licensee of the Sir Walter Scott on the Osmaston Road, Derby in about 1950, and later the New Inn at Chellaston, close to the pub his brother Tom ran.

References

Sources
 Profile at leeds-fans.org.uk

1906 births
1979 deaths
Footballers from Derby
English footballers
English Football League players
Leeds United F.C. players
Bradford City A.F.C. players
Reading F.C. players
Stalybridge Celtic F.C. players
People from Chellaston
Association football forwards